The M-4 Commando Mortar also known as a "patrol mortar" is a lightweight 60 mm commando mortar manufactured by Denel Land Systems.

Description
As with other mortars of this type it is intended for rapid use over short ranges as a fire support weapon. It has a lanyard operated trigger mechanism in the breech which allows it to be carried loaded with a bomb, unlike other mortars that have fixed firing pins.
The lack of a bipod means it is not as accurate as a conventional mortar and is unsuitable for sustained fire use. The sighting system incorporated in the handle consists of a pair of curved spirit levels one to indicate that it upright in the lateral plane and the other indicates the range with a charge table. Beta lights illuminate the sight for night use.

Ammunition
It uses the M-61 series of bombs in high explosive, smoke, illumination and practice versions.

Variants 
 M4: pulled a lanyard released the firing mechanism
 M4 Mk 1: equipped with a fixed firing pin
 M4L3: version with simplified baseplate and sight, range is shorter (1,200m).

Users
 - Colombian Army
: M4L3
 - South African Army

Specifications

Type: Muzzle loading mortar
Calibre: 60 mm
Mass: Total 7.2 kg - Barrel 3.2 kg - Breech 0.9 kg - Baseplate 1.9 kg - Sight/handle - 1.1 kg
Barrel length: 650 mm
Traverse: 300 mil
Elevation: 710 to 1510 mil
Muzzle velocity: 171 m/s
Range: 100 m minimum - 2100 m maximum

References

External links
M4 mortar on Manufacturer's website, archived by the Internet Archive

Post–Cold War weapons of South Africa
Infantry mortars
Denel
60mm mortars